NAF or Naf may refer to:

Organizations 
 NAF, a U.S. education non-profit organization formerly known as National Academy Foundation
 National Abortion Federation, a U.S. organization of abortion providers
 National Academies Forum, the peak body for the four learned academies in Australia
 Netherland-America Foundation, an organization which supports exchange between the United States and The Netherlands
 New America Foundation a Washington, DC-based think tank
 Norwegian Automobile Federation, an association of car owners
 Norwegian Employers' Confederation
 Norwegian Union of General Workers
 National Arbitration Forum, a U.S. arbitration and mediation firm
 Nordisk Andels Forbund ("Nordic Coöp Federation"), the predecessor to Coop Norden

Defense 
 Nigerian Air Force
 NATO Architecture Framework, an architecture framework used by NATO
 Naval Air Facility, a lower-level naval air station in the United States Navy
 Naval Aircraft Factory, operated in Philadelphia from 1918 to 1945
 Numbered Air Force in the United States Air Force
 United Armed Forces of Novorossiya, Eastern Ukrainian pro-Russian separatists fighting the Ukrainian government for independence

Science and mathematics 
 Negation as failure, logic in which a statement that cannot be shown to be true is considered false rather than unknown
 Non-adjacent form, a signed-digit representation of numbers in mathematics and cryptography
 Sodium fluoride, a chemical compound whose formula is NaF
 Neutrophil-activating factor

Other uses 
 National Academy Foundation School, a public high school located in Baltimore, Maryland
 Native American flute, an end-blown flute from North America
 North Anatolian Fault, Turkey
 Naf River, a river between Bangladesh and Myanmar
 Nice As Fuck, an American indie rock band
 Nuffle Amorical Football, fictional governing body for the fantasy football game, Blood Bowl
 Netherlands Antillean guilder, often shortened to NAf